The Buffalo AKG Art Museum, formerly known as the Albright–Knox Art Gallery, is an art museum at 1285 Elmwood Avenue, Buffalo, New York, in Delaware Park.  the museum's Elmwood Avenue campus is temporarily closed for construction. It hosted exhibitions and events at Albright-Knox Northland, a project space at 612 Northland Avenue in Buffalo’s Northland Corridor. The new museum is expected to open May 25, 2023. 

The gallery is a major showplace for modern art and contemporary art. It is directly opposite Buffalo State College and the Burchfield Penney Art Center.

History

The parent organization of the Buffalo AKG Art Museum is the Buffalo Fine Arts Academy, founded in 1862, one of the oldest public arts institutions in the United States. On January 15, 1900, Buffalo entrepreneur and philanthropist John J. Albright, a wealthy Buffalo industrialist, donated funds to the Academy to begin construction of an art gallery. The building was designed by prominent local architect Edward Brodhead Green. It was originally intended to be used as the Fine Arts Pavilion for the Pan-American Exposition in 1901, but delays in its construction caused it to remain uncompleted until 1905. When it finally opened its doors on May 31, 1905, it was named the Albright Art Gallery.

Clifton Hall, the third building on the museum's campus, was constructed in 1920 as the Buffalo Society of Natural Sciences. Today, Clifton Hall houses the F. Paul Norton and Frederic P. Norton Family Prints And Drawings Study Center, the AK Innovation Lab, working spaces for the Public Art Initiative, and staff offices.

In 1962, a new addition was made to the gallery through the contributions of Seymour H. Knox, Jr. and his family, and many other donors. At this time the museum was renamed the Albright–Knox Art Gallery. The new building was designed by Skidmore, Owings and Merrill architect Gordon Bunshaft, who is noted for the Lever House in New York City. The Buffalo AKG Art Museum is listed in the National Register of Historic Places.

The museum first began discussing a possible expansion in 2001. In 2012, the board commissioned the architectural firm Snøhetta to produce a master plan for future growth. In 2014, the board voted to initiate a museum expansion and, in June 2016, the museum announced its selection of OMA partner Shohei Shigematsu as the architect for the project. Doubleline CEO and Buffalo native Jeffrey Gundlach has pledged $42.5 million to the project, while businesses, foundations, government groups, and individuals have promised matching funds toward a $125 million goal.

The museum is part of the Monuments Men and Women Museum Network, launched in 2021 by the Monuments Men Foundation for the Preservation of Art.

Exhibitions
In 1910, the museum hosted the International Exhibition of Pictorial Photography  (November 3–December 1, 1910), curated by Alfred Stieglitz. It was the first ever show organized by an American museum that aimed to elevate photography’s stature to that of a fine art. In 1978, the museum's exhibition on the work of Richard Diebenkorn was chosen to represent the United States at the 28th Venice Biennale. In 1988, the museum again won the competition to organize the exhibition representing the United States in Venice; the museum's curator Michael G. Auping proposed media artist Jenny Holzer.

Collection

The Buffalo AKG Art Museum has long operated not by collecting artists' work in depth but by trying to acquire key works.  The gallery's collection includes works spanning Impressionistic and Post-Impressionistic styles by artists of the nineteenth century such as Paul Gauguin, Edgar Degas, Berthe Morisot, Claude Monet, and Vincent van Gogh.

Revolutionary styles from the early twentieth century such as abstraction, cubism, surrealism, and constructivism are represented in works by artists like Pablo Picasso, Georges Braque, Jean Metzinger, Albert Gleizes, Henri Matisse, André Derain, Joan Miró, Piet Mondrian, Giacomo Balla, Sonia Delaunay, Georgia O'Keeffe, Amedeo Modigliani, and Alexander Rodchenko. Frida Kahlo is represented by Self-Portrait with Monkey. 

Because of Seymour H. Knox and Gordon M. Smith, a former director, the Albright-Knox was one of the first museums to collect Abstract Expressionism in depth. That movement is widely represented in the collection with works by artists including Arshile Gorky, Jackson Pollock, Joan Mitchell, Franz Kline, Robert Motherwell, Adolph Gottlieb, and Helen Frankenthaler. The museum owns the second-largest collection of paintings by Clyfford Still: 33 abstract works that span the most critical developments of his career from 1937 to 1963. They include 31 paintings donated to the museum in 1964 by Still and two paintings acquired in 1957 and 1959 as gifts of Seymour H. Knox, Jr.

Additionally, the gallery is rich in further examples of post-war American and European art. Works of pop art, minimalism, and art of the 1970s through the end of the twentieth century can be found represented by artists such as Lee Bontecou, Chryssa, Alberto Giacometti, Eva Hesse, Robert Rauschenberg, Jasper Johns, Howardena Pindell, Ed Clark, Kiki Smith, Félix González-Torres, and Andy Warhol. 

At her death in 2016 pop artist Marisol left her estate to the museum including hundreds of works of art, making it the largest collection of her work in the world. 

Their contemporary collection includes pieces by artists such as Cory Arcangel, Tony Conrad, Mark Bradford, Nick Cave,  Simone Leigh, Georg Baselitz, John Connell, and Per Kirkeby. The museum bought Anselm Kiefer's large-scale Die Milchstrasse (The Milkyway) (1985–1987) in 1988 to celebrate its 125th anniversary.

Before its 2019-2023 expansion, The Buffalo AKG Art Museum exhibition space could accommodate only 200 works — just 3% of its 6,740-piece collection.

Selected collection highlights

Paintings

The Buffalo AKG Art Museum has more than 6,500 works in its collection, below is a list highlighting a few other notable works:

Sculptures
The gallery contains a variety of sculptures on the exterior grounds. Some of the most notable, from the past and the present, include:

Deaccessioning and the Albright-Knox's mission

In 2007, the Albright–Knox Art Gallery sold a Roman-era bronze sculpture, Artemis and the Stag, that was auctioned at Sotheby's New York on June 7, 2007, and brought $28.6 million. This was the highest price ever paid at auction for an antiquity or a sculpture of any period, according to Sotheby's. It was purchased by the London dealer Giuseppe Eskenazi on behalf of a private European collector.

The event brought national attention to what until then had been a local question, the mission of the Albright-Knox. In February 2007, when the list of works to be deaccessioned was made public, Albright-Knox Director Louis Grachos defined the ancient sculpture as falling outside the institution's historical "core mission" of "acquiring and exhibiting art of the present." This definition made public critics wonder whether the position at the Gallery of "William Hogarth's Lady's Last Stake or Sir Joshua Reynolds' Cupid as a Link Boy were secure. Works by Gustave Courbet, Honoré Daumier, Jacques-Louis David and Eugène Delacroix had been purchased by the museum in earlier decades.<ref>[http://www.artsjournal.com/culturegrrl/2007/02/mission_creep_albrightknox_bel.html Lee Rosenbaum, "Mission Creep: Albright-Knox Belatedly Releases Its Complete Deaccession List" Arts Journal]</ref>

The decision to deaccession certain art works was made by a vote of the museum's Board of Directors, was voted on and ratified by the entire membership, and followed the guidelines of the American Alliance of Museums. The sale raised questions about how museums can remain vital when they are situated in economically declining regions and have limited means for raising funds for operations and acquisitions.

Hours
The gallery is open from 10 a.m. to 5 p.m., Tuesday through Sunday.  On the first Friday of each month, the gallery is open from 10 a.m. to 10 p.m. with free admission to the permanent collection through the support of M&T Bank.

Management

Governance
Since 2013, Janne Sirén has been director of the Albright–Knox Art Gallery. Sirén is believed to be the first director from the Nordic region to take the helm of a major American art museum.

Complete list of directors:
 Janne Gallen-Kallela-Sirén (2013–present)
 Louis Grachos (2002-2013)
 Douglas G. Schultz (1983-2002)
 Robert T. Buck, Jr. (1973-1983)
 Gordon M. Smith (1955–1973)
 Edgar C. Schenck (1949–1955) 
 Andrew C. Ritchie (1942–1949) 
 Gordon B. Washburn (1931–1942) 
 William M. Hekking (1925–1931) 
 Cornelia Bentley Sage Quinton (1910–1924) 
 Charles McMeen Kurtz (1905–1909)

Funding
As of 2007, the Albright–Knox Art Gallery's endowment stood at about $58 million, generating about $1.1 million a year for acquisitions. Since the proceeds from the sale of some 200 works of art in 2007 were added to the preexisting $22 million acquisitions endowment, the museum has been able to spend as much as almost $5 million on new art annually. In 2013, the Albright–Knox Art Gallery received an $11 million bequest from the estate of longtime board member and Buffalo arts patron Peggy Pierce Elfvin, possibly the largest single gift in the museum's history.

See also
John J. AlbrightPortrait of Seymour H. Knox''
Seymour H. Knox II

References

External links
 
 Buffalo Architecture and History: Albright-Knox Art Gallery, with photos and more detailed history
Albright–Knox Art Gallery within Google Arts & Culture

 
Art museums and galleries in New York (state)
Museums in Buffalo, New York
Contemporary art galleries in the United States
Modern art museums in the United States
Museums of American art
Architecture of Buffalo, New York
National Register of Historic Places in Buffalo, New York
Museums on the National Register of Historic Places in New York (state)
Institutions accredited by the American Alliance of Museums
1905 establishments in New York (state)
Art museums established in 1905
Skidmore, Owings & Merrill buildings
Modernist architecture in New York (state)
Neoclassical architecture in New York (state)
FRAME Museums
Green & Wicks buildings